Rice Lake is a lake in Washington County, in the U.S. state of Minnesota.

Rice Lake was named for its abundant wild rice.

See also
List of lakes in Minnesota

References

Lakes of Minnesota
Lakes of Washington County, Minnesota